The 2011 All-Ireland Senior Ladies' Football Championship Final featured  and . This was the second of three All-Ireland Ladies' football finals between 2008 and 2013 that saw Cork play Monaghan. According to a report in the Irish Independent, "just two soft goals separated (Cork) from Monaghan". The first goal came after just 21 minutes when goalkeeper Linda Martin opted for a short kick-out which badly back-fired when Nollaig Cleary intercepted it and chipped her. That goal gave Cork a 1–3 to 0–4 half-time lead. Within 10 minutes of the restart, Monaghan scored three unanswered points, one from Ciara McAnespie and two from Niamh Kindlon. The turning point came when Cork's Orla Finn was rugby tackled by Monaghan's Isobel Kierans which resulted in a penalty. Rhona Ní Bhuachalla subsequently scored from the spot to give Cork a three-point lead. Points from Caoimhe Mohan, Laura McEnaney and Cathriona McConnell pulled it back to a point with just five minutes remaining. However Rena Buckley scored a late point for Cork to see them win by two points.

Route to the Final

Match info

Teams

References

 
All-Ireland Senior Ladies' Football Championship Finals
Cork county ladies' football team matches
Monaghan county ladies' football team matches
All-Ireland